In statistical theory, a pseudolikelihood is an approximation to the  joint probability distribution of a collection of random variables. The practical use of this is that it can provide an approximation to the likelihood function of a set of observed data which may either provide a computationally simpler problem for estimation, or may provide a way of obtaining explicit estimates of model parameters.

The pseudolikelihood approach was introduced by Julian Besag in the context of analysing data having spatial dependence.

Definition

in discrete case and 

in continuous one. 
The expression  is the probability that the vector of variables  has values equal to the vector . This probability of course depends on the unknown parameter . Because situations can often be described using state variables ranging over a set of possible values, the expression  can therefore represent the probability of a certain state among all possible states allowed by the state variables.

The pseudo-log-likelihood is a similar measure derived from the above expression, namely (in discrete case)

One use of the pseudolikelihood measure is as an approximation for inference about a Markov or Bayesian network, as the pseudolikelihood of an assignment to  may often be computed more efficiently than the likelihood, particularly when the latter may require marginalization over a large number of variables.

Properties
Use of the pseudolikelihood in place of the true likelihood function in a maximum likelihood analysis can lead to good estimates, but a straightforward application of the usual likelihood techniques to derive information about estimation uncertainty, or for significance testing, would in general be incorrect.

References 

Statistical inference